The Ministry of Economy and Finance of Morocco is a department of the Government of Morocco in charge of public finances of Morocco.

Ministers of Economy and Finance
Abdelkader Benjelloun, December 1955 - October 1956
Charif Abdellah Chefchaouni, July 1958 - July 1958
Abderrahim Bouabid, December 1958 - May 1960
M'hamed Douiri, May 1960 - January 1963
Driss Slaoui, January 1963 - August 1964
Mohamed Cherkaoui, August 1964 - June 1965
Mamoun Tahiri, June 1965 - March 1970
Abdelkrim Lazrak, March 1970 - August 1971
Mohammed El M'Daghri, August 1971 - August 1971
Mohammed Karim Lamrani, August 1971 - April 1972
Mustapha Faris, April 1972 - November 1972
Bensalem Ghessous, November 1972 - April 1974
Abdelkader Benslimane, March 1974 - November 1977
Abdellatif Ghissassi, October 1977 - March 1979
Abdelkamel Reghaye, March 1979 - November 1981
Abdellatif Jouahri, November 1981 - April 1986
Mohamed Berrada, April 1986 - November 1993
M'hamed Sagou, November 1993 - July 1994
Mourad Chrif, July 1994 - February 1995
Mohammed Kabbaj, February 1995 - August 1997
Abdelfatah Benmansour, August 1997 - March 1998
Driss Jettou, August 1997 - March 1998
Fathallah Oualalou, March 1998 - October 2007
Salaheddine Mezouar, October 2007 - January 2012
Nizar Baraka, January 2012 - August 2013
Idriss Azami Al Idrissi, October 2013 - April 2017
Mohamed Boussaid, October 2013 - August 2018
Mohamed Benchaboun, August 2018 - October 2021
Nadia Fettah Alaoui, October 2021 
Source:

See also
 Government of Morocco
 Economy of Morocco

References 

Finance
Morocco
Government of Morocco
Economy of Morocco